The 2016 Ladies Tour of Qatar was the 8th edition of the Ladies Tour of Qatar. It was organised by the Qatar Cycling Federation with technical and sports-related assistance from Amaury Sport Organisation (A.S.O.) under the regulations of the Union Cycliste Internationale (category 2.1). It took place from 2 February until 5 February 2016 and consisted of 4 stages. 15 teams of 6 riders took part.

Teams

UCI Women's Teams

Canyon–SRAM

Team Liv-Plantur

Lares–Waowdeals

National Teams

Route

Stages

Stage 1
2 February 2016 – Qatar University to Qatar University,

Stage 2
3 February 2016 – Sheikh Faisal Museum to Al Khor Corniche,

Stage 3
4 February 2016 – Al Zubarah Fort to Al Shamal, 
A year after her last stage win, also at Al Shamal, Ellen van Dijk made the best of her time-trialling skills to conquer her third success in Qatar. The Dutch rider from Boels-Dolmans, part of a breakaway group that took off as soon as the first few kilometres of a windswept day, powered away in the last two kilometres of the race. She was never to be caught and triumphantly crossed the line on her own, clear of Kirsten Wild and Lauretta Hanson. The golden jersey changes shoulders and goes to Germany’s Trixi Worrack.

Stage 4
5 February 2016 – Aspire Zone to Doha Corniche,

Classification leadership table

Broadcasting
 beIN Sports (live)

See also
2016 in women's road cycling

References

External links
 

Tour of Qatar
Tour of Qatar
Ladies Tour of Qatar